Gerard Ambassa Guy (born 21 September 1978), nicknamed JJ, is a Cameroonian-born Hong Kong association football coach and former professional player who currently as an amateur plays for Hong Kong Third Division club King Mountain.

He played for Happy Valley, Yee Hope, Instant-Dict, Hong Kong Rangers, South China, Pegasus and Sun Hei in the past.

He is also a football coach currently.

Club career
Gerard first arrived in Hong Kong to play for Rangers. Subsequently he played for Instant-Dict, O & YH Union, Happy Valley AA and in 2009 joined South China AA.

South China
In 2009, he joined South China. He scored in the 5:4 away defeat to Neftchi Farg'ona in the quarter finals 1st leg. Then he scored a last minute away goal in the 1:2 semi-final defeat by Kuwait SC in the 2009 AFC Cup, thus setting up a crucial home game for South China in Hong Kong. The Hong Kong Stadium was packed for the second leg match on 21 October 2009 but South China lost 0:1.

TSW Pegasus
He joined TSW Pegasus on loan from South China AA in the summer of 2010. On 23 September 2009, Gerard Ambassa Guy was sent off in a league game after two bookable offenses, but TSW Pegasus won 4:0 over Citizen.

On 1 March 2011, Gerard scored with a header to help TSW Pegasus secure a 2:1 win over Song Lam Nghe An in the 2011 AFC Cup group game away in Vietnam.

Mohun Bagan
On 23 July 2010, the Cameroonian-born Hong Kong footballer arrived in Kolkata for a trial with Indian club Mohun Bagan as an Asian origin player.

Sun Hei SC
Gerard joined Sun Hei for the 2011-12 Hong Kong First Division League season.

Managerial career
On 4 December 2017, Guy took over as manager of Rangers after Dejan Antonić's departure from the club.

International
Gerard Ambassa Guy became a member of the Hong Kong National Football Team after he had spent more than seven years in Hong Kong and gained Hong Kong citizenship. He took part in the 2010 East Asian Football Championship semi-finals tournament in Kaoshiung and received the Most Valuable Player award.

Honours
Happy Valley
 Hong Kong First Division: 2002-03, 2005–06
 Hong Kong Senior Shield: 2003-04
 Hong Kong FA Cup: 2003-04

Career statistics

Club career
As of 30 August 2009

International career 
As of 17 November 2010

References

External links
 Gerard Ambassa Guy at HKFA
 Gerard Ambassa Guy's profile at hvaaclub.com
 Gérard Guy Ambassa, Champion de Hong Kong 

1978 births
Living people
Hong Kong footballers
Hong Kong international footballers
Cameroonian footballers
Cameroonian emigrants to Hong Kong
Hong Kong people of Cameroonian descent
Happy Valley AA players
Hong Kong First Division League players
Hong Kong Premier League players
Hong Kong Rangers FC players
Double Flower FA players
Yee Hope players
TSW Pegasus FC players
Dreams Sports Club players
Expatriate footballers in Indonesia
Footballers at the 2006 Asian Games
Association football utility players
Foshan Fosti F.C. players
Naturalized footballers of Hong Kong
Association football defenders
Association football midfielders
Association football forwards
Hong Kong football managers
Asian Games competitors for Hong Kong
Hong Kong League XI representative players